Cork West may refer to:

West Cork (UK Parliament constituency)
West Cork (podcast)
Cork West (Dáil constituency) (1923–1969)

See also 
West Cork